Two Bridges may refer to:

Places
 In England
 Two Bridges, Devon
 Two Bridges, Cornwall
 Two Bridges, Gloucestershire

 In the United States
 Two Bridges, Manhattan

 more
 Zweibrücken in Germany, literally the Two Bridges